Pănătău is a commune in Buzău County, Muntenia, Romania. It is composed of nine villages: Begu, Lacu cu Anini, Măguricea, Pănătău, Plăișor, Râpile, Sibiciu de Jos, Tega and Zaharești.

References

Communes in Buzău County
Localities in Muntenia